The Metropolitan Catholic Colleges Sports Association (MCC) was an association of eight Roman Catholic secondary schools in Sydney, New South Wales, Australia, that share common interests, ethics, educational philosophy and competed in sporting competitions among themselves.

Schools

Current member schools

Sports

Current 

 Athletics
 Basketball
 Cricket
 Cross Country
 Football (Soccer)
 Rugby League
 Squash
 Swimming
 Touch Football
 Tennis
 Volleyball
 Golf

Discontinued/Former Members

 Rugby Union

The MCC has discontinued their rugby union competition between the associated schools; however, they remain fielding teams in the Under 16s and Under 18s divisions at the NSWCCC Rugby Union Carnival.

St Leo's Catholic College Wahroonga has left the competition in 2013 to join the Broken Bay Secondary Schools Sports Association which let new members Holy Cross College Ryde to join the competition in the 2013/14 summer season and 2014 winter season.

NSWCCC Performances

Over the past several years, the MCC has had success with at least four boys who had once competed for MCC now in first-grade rugby league; (in order of NRL debut) Mitchell Pearce, Liam Foran, Jamal Idris and Kieran Foran.

In 2011, the MCC U/16's side placed first in the NSWCCC rugby union carnival being undefeated during the two-day carnival, winning their games 32–5, 10–7 and 20–12, however only 3 boys made the NSWCCC U/16's side and 3 making the shadow side (in case of injury). 2 boys from the U/18's team also made their respective NSWCCC squad.

See also 

 List of Catholic schools in New South Wales
 Catholic education in Australia

External links 
 MCC Website
 Christian Brothers' High School, Lewisham
 De La Salle College, Ashfield
 Holy Cross College Ryde
 LaSalle Catholic College, Bankstown
 Marcellin College, Randwick
 Marist College Kogarah
 Marist Catholic College North Shore, North Sydney
 Champagnat Catholic College Pagewood

 
Australian school sports associations
Sports organizations established in 1915
1915 establishments in Australia